The 2021–22 Western Football League season (known as the 2021–22 Toolstation Western Football League for sponsorship reasons) was the 120th in the history of the Western Football League, a football competition in England. Teams were divided into two divisions; the Premier and the First. 

The constitution was announced on 18 May 2021.

After the abandonment of the previous two seasons due to the COVID-19 pandemic, a number of promotions were decided on a points per game basis over the 2019–20 and 2020–21 seasons.

Premier Division
The Premier Division was reduced to 19 clubs from 21 after Plymouth Parkway were promoted to the Southern League, and Bradford Town, Chipping Sodbury Town, Cribbs, Hallen, Roman Glass St George and Westbury United were transferred to the Hellenic League. Odd Down requested demotion to Division One, which the league accepted.

Prior to this season, Bridgwater Town merged with women's club Yeovil United, forming Bridgwater United.

Six new clubs joined the division.
From Division One:
Ashton & Backwell United

From the South West Peninsula League Premier Division East:
Ilfracombe Town
Millbrook

From the South West Peninsula League Premier Division West:
Helston Athletic
Mousehole
Saltash United

League table

Stadia and locations

First Division
The First Division was increased from 20 clubs to 21 after Ashton & Backwell United were promoted to the Premier Division, and Calne Town and Corsham Town were promoted and transferred to the Hellenic League Premier Division.

Four new clubs joined:
AEK Boco, promoted from the Gloucestershire County Football League
Gillingham Town, promoted from the Dorset Premier Football League
Odd Down, voluntarily demoted from the Premier Division
Tytherington Rocks, transferred from the Hellenic Football League Division One West

League table

Promotion playoffs

 Welton Rovers were at home for their playoff semi-final as Wincanton Town were unable to host the fixture.

Stadia and locations

References
 League tables

External links
 Western League Official Site

2021–22
9